Silvascincus is a genus of skinks, lizards in the family Scincidae. Both species in the genus are endemic to Australia. They were previously placed in the genus Eulamprus.

Species
The following two species, listed alphabetically by specific name, are recognized as being valid:

Silvascincus murrayi  – blue-speckled forest-skink
Silvascincus tryoni  – Border Ranges blue-spectacled skink, forest skink

Nota bene: A binomial authority in parentheses indicates that the species was originally described in a genus other than Silvascincus.

References

External links

Silvascincus
Lizard genera
Skinks of Australia
Endemic fauna of Australia
Taxa named by Adam Skinner
Taxa named by Mark Norman Hutchinson
Taxa named by Michael S. Y. Lee